Jašek or Jasek is a surname. It may refer to:

Jašek
Jaroslav Jašek (1946–2010), orienteering competitor who competed for Czechoslovakia
Lukáš Jašek (born 1997), Czech ice hockey player

Jasek
Magdalena Jasek, Polish fashion model
Richard Jasek (born 1964/1965), Czechoslovakia-born Australian television producer, writer and director

Surnames from given names